Notting Hill: Original Motion Picture Soundtrack is the soundtrack to the 1999 film of the same name released by Island Records on 17 May 1999 in United States and 24 May in United Kingdom and rest of Europe. The album featured 13 tracks in each versions that are varied from each album; it includes songs performed by Shania Twain, Elvis Costello, Bill Withers, Al Green, 98°, Steve Poltz amongst several others. It also featured incidental underscore composed by Trevor Jones with one of his cues that was in the film, had been split into two songs for the soundtrack, along with excerpts of Jones' score being used throughout the film. The album was made available in CDs and cassettes on its inital release, while a vinyl edition of the album was released on 28 May 2019, 20 years after the film's original release. It received a Brit Award for Best Soundtrack in 2000.

Reception 
Stephen Thomas Erlewine of AllMusic wrote "The soundtrack is every bit as consciously classy as the film it supports. If it isn't as ingratiating, that's because it's significantly harder to offer a twist on a formula soundtrack album than on a formula movie. With a film, little details, supporting characters, and subtle, interesting visuals give the movie identity within a formula. Unfortunately, a soundtrack remains a collection of oldies, newer songs, and score excerpts, no matter how much you shake it up, and that's the case here." Filmtracks.com wrote "The sequencing of tracks is different on nearly all of them. There are some downright beautiful solo performances on the expanded promo or bootlegged albums of Jones' score, especially involving the piano writing. But is either of these full-score options worth the search as opposed to commercial song and score combination album? For most listeners, no. The songs are really quite enticing, and since they fit the mood of Jones' underscore very well, they make a nice overall balance. In those eight minutes on the commercial album, the most significant of Jones' orchestral outbursts of theme is presented. Still, though, Jones continues to impress in the entirety of his work, proving his versatility once again."

Track listing

Charts

Weekly charts

Year-end charts

Certifications

References 

1999 soundtrack albums
Island Records soundtracks
1990s film soundtrack albums